Stonewood Center, sometimes referred to as Stonewood Mall, is a shopping mall located in Downey, California, which is one of the Gateway Cities of Southeastern Los Angeles County. It is located at the intersection of Firestone and Lakewood Boulevards, and it is from this intersection that the mall's name is derived ("Firestone" + "Lakewood"). It is within a few miles of many freeways in the area: I-5 and I-605, I-710 and I-105 freeways. The mall is owned and operated by The Macerich Company and is part of its trifecta of malls in southeast Los Angeles County along with the Los Cerritos Center in Cerritos and the Lakewood Center in Lakewood. Stonewood Center comprises 145 stores, including several restaurants.

The mall is anchored by J. C. Penney, Macy's, Kohl's and Sears.

History
Before Stonewood Center, in the 1940s and 1950s, Downtown Huntington Park was the most popular upscale shopping district for residents of Downey South Gate, Bell, and Cudahy.

The land which Stonewood is built on is on a 100 year lease from the Ball Family who used to farm Oranges on the ground before the mall was built. The Ball family still owns the ground.

In 1953, William M. Lansdale of Downey announced plans to establish Downey as the next shopping "mecca" in the area and build a 63-acre shopping center.

Construction was kicked off in late 1957.

Prior to the opening of the mall proper, in February 1956, construction began with a $750,000 coffee shop and restaurant, Stonewood Restaurant, designed by Pereira & Luckman, who also designed the Theme Building at Los Angeles International Airport and numerous other Greater Los Angeles mid-century landmark buildings. Downey Stonewood Community Bank and a 40,000-square-foot Shopping Bag Food Stores also opened during this time.

The mall opened on October 9, 1958, with a larger gross leasable area than the original plan and 40 stores including J. C. Penney, W. T. Grant and Woolworth variety stores, Thrifty Drug, Miller, Miller West Men's, Downey Music and Hollander Cafeteria.

In the 1960s, the mall was expanded with a  Broadway department store (opened 1965, now a Sears), and in 1966, Farrell's Ice Cream Parlour, Showcase Cinemas, an additional twin cinema, and a Radio Shack.

In the 1970s the center grew, taking up more of the original land, with almost 80 stores.

A 2-story Mervyn's (now Kohl's) was added in 1981.

In 1986 Stonewood was sold to Hughes Investments, which funded the 1990 $100-million transformation into an enclosed mall which included over 40 new stores, a May Company California department store anchor, and Acapulco and Olive Garden restaurants. By the mid-1990s, the center had almost  of gross leasable area.

In 1993, the May Company rebranded as Robinsons-May, and in 2006 it was rebranded as Macy's.

In 1996, The Broadway closed its branch, and Sears took over the building and built a Sears Auto Center in an outparcel.

In 2009, Kohl's opened occupying the vacated Mervyn's building.

In September 2021, it was announced that Sears would be closing at the mall.

References 

Macerich
Shopping malls in Southeast Los Angeles County, California
Downey, California
Shopping malls established in 1958